Gita Siddharth (died 14 December 2019) was an Indian actress and social worker. She acted in mainstream Bollywood as well as art  cinema, like Parichay (1972), Garm Hava (1973), and Gaman (1978).

She was best known for her role in M.S. Sathyu's Garm Hava (1973), at the 21st National Film Awards, where the film won the award for Best Feature Film on National Integration, and she received a souvenir as the lead actress.

She was married to documentary maker, television producer, and presenter, Siddharth Kak, most known for his cultural magazine show, Surabhi in 1990s. Their daughter Antara Kak is a documentary film maker. Gita was also an art director with the show. She died on 14 December 2019.

Selected filmography

 Parichay (1972)
 Garm Hava (1973)
 Sholay (1975)
 Doosra Aadmi (1977)
 Gaman (1978)
 Trishul (1978)
 Noorie (1979)
 Sadgati (1981)
 Ladaaku  (1981)
 Shaukeen (1982)
 Suraag (1982)
 Desh Premee (1982)
 Arth (1982)
 Disco Dancer (1982)
 Mandi (1983)
 Nishaan (1983)
 Kasam Paida Karne Wale Ki (1984)
Zabardast (1985)
 Ram Teri Ganga Maili (1985)
 Alag Alag (1985)
Ilzaam (1986)
 Ek Chadar Maili Si (1986)
Ek Aur Sikander (1986)
 Nazrana (1987 film)
 Dance Dance (1987)
Paap Ki Duniya (1988)
Paap Ko Jalaa Kar Raakh Kar Doonga (1988)
Farz Ki Jung (1989)
 Insaaf Apne Lahoo Se (1994)

References

External links
 
 

Indian film actresses
Actresses in Hindi cinema
People from Maharashtra
20th-century Indian actresses
Year of birth missing
2019 deaths
Place of death missing
Place of birth missing